Chak Khasa is a village beside the Jhelum River and union council of Jhelum District in the Punjab Province of Pakistan. It is part of Jhelum Tehsil. Majority of the population belong to the Mughal and Panhwar Sohlan Rajput's, Also the Nawab of Jhelum family resides here.

References

Populated places in Tehsil Jhelum
Union councils of Jhelum Tehsil